The 1946 Wyoming Cowboys football team was an American football team that represented the University of Wyoming in the Mountain States Conference (MSC) during the 1946 college football season.  In their third and final season under head coach Bunny Oakes, the Cowboys compiled a 1–8–1 record (0–6 against MSC opponents), finished in seventh place out of seven teams in the MSC, and were outscored by a total of 192 to 44.

Back Hank Kolasinski was selected by the International News Service as a first-team player on the 1946 All-Mountain States football team. Tackle Clayton was named to the second team.

Schedule

After the season

The 1947 NFL Draft was held on December 16, 1946. The following Cowboys were selected.

References

Wyoming
Wyoming Cowboys football seasons
Wyoming Cowboys football